Willi is a given name, nickname (often a short form or hypocorism of Wilhelm) and surname. Notable people with the name include:

Given name
 Willi Apel (1893–1988), German-American musicologist
 Willi Boskovsky (1909–1991), Austrian violinist and conductor
 Willi Forst (1903–1980), born Wilhelm Anton Frohs, Austrian actor, screenwriter, film director, film producer and singer
 Willi Hennig (1913–1976), German biologist 
 Willi Liebherr (born 1947), German-Swiss businessman and billionaire
 Willi Smith (1948–1987), African-American fashion designer
 Willi Ziegler (1929–2002), German paleontologist

Nickname
 Willi Graf (1918–1943), member of the White Rose anti-Nazi resistance group under consideration for sainthood
 Willi Münzenberg (1889–1940), German communist political activist and publisher
 Willi Orbán (born 1992), German-Hungarian footballer
 Willi Ostermann (1876–1936), German lyricist, composer and singer of carnival songs and songs about Cologne
 Willi Schmid (1893–1934), German music critic
 Willi Stoph (1914–1999), East German politician
 Willi Tokarev (1934–2019), Russian and former expatriate Russian-American singer-songwriter
 Willi Weber (born 1942), manager of German racing drivers

Surname
 Andrea Willi (born 1955), politician from Liechtenstein, first woman Minister of Foreign Affairs
 Andreas Willi (born 1972), Swiss linguist, philologist and classicist
 Herbert Willi (born 1956), Austrian composer of classical music
 Monika Willi (born 1968), Austrian film editor

See also
 Wili (disambiguation)
 Willy (disambiguation)
 William (given name)

German masculine given names
Lists of people by nickname
Hypocorisms